The Webster County Courthouse in Dixon, Kentucky, on Dixon's Courthouse Square, is a Moderne-style courthouse built in 1938.  It was a Works Progress Administration project.

It is a three-story poured concrete building,  in plan.

References

Courthouses on the National Register of Historic Places in Kentucky
Moderne architecture in the United States
Government buildings completed in 1938
National Register of Historic Places in Webster County, Kentucky
1938 establishments in Kentucky
County courthouses in Kentucky
Works Progress Administration in Kentucky